Malahide Cricket Club was founded in 1861 and is situated within Malahide Castle demesne, near the railway station. 
The club has over 400 members and is open all year round. The club currently fields 20 teams (5 Senior Men’s, 2 Ladies, Development XI, 12 youth and a Taverners side).

The club has won a number of honours in its history, most notably the Irish Senior Cup in 2002 (Men's) and the Ladies' Senior Cup and Pilkington Plate competitions.

Home ground

The Village or Malahide Cricket Club Ground is a cricket ground in Malahide, Ireland. The ground is owned by the Malahide Cricket Club and has been developed to take a capacity of 11,500 when using temporary grandstands making it Ireland's biggest cricket venue.

In September 2013, International Cricket Council cleared the ground to host an international cricket match. The ground hosted its first international cricket match when home team Ireland played against England, with England winning by six wickets after captain Eoin Morgan hit 124 not out on what had been his home ground in his youth.

Malahide was also set to be the stage for two Twenty20 games against the touring South Africa A side in 2012, but both games were cancelled.

The ground became Ireland's third venue for international cricket, along with Castle Avenue in Dublin and the Civil Service Cricket Club Ground at Stormont.

Honours
Irish Senior Cup: 1
2002
 National Irish Cup
2013
Leinster Senior League: 4
1964, 1971, 1977, 1980
Leinster Senior Cup: 2
1959, 1971

Notable players

 Eoin Morgan
 Johan Botha

References

External links 
Website

Sports clubs in Fingal
Cricket clubs in County Dublin
Sports venues in Fingal
Leinster Senior League (cricket) teams
1861 establishments in Ireland
Malahide